Giorgio Tornati (born 5 November 1937) is an Italian politician who served as a Senator (1987–1992) and Mayor of Pesaro for three terms (1978–1980, 1980–1985, 1985–1987).

References

1937 births
Italian Communist Party politicians
Mayors of Pesaro
People from Pesaro
Senators of Legislature X of Italy
Living people